Kalinino is a village in the Goygol Rayon of Azerbaijan. It is named after Mikhail Kalinin, a Soviet revolutionary and a member of the Politburo of the Communist Party of the Soviet Union.

References 

Populated places in Goygol District